The Hermitage of Santa María de La Piscina (Spanish: Ermita de Santa María de La Piscina) is a medieval church located in San Vicente de la Sonsierra, La Rioja, Spain.
It was consecrated in 1137.

It was apparently founded by Ramiro Sánchez to house relics from the Holy Land, notably a supposed fragment of the True Cross. The dedication of the building refers to the Pool of Bethesda.

Conservation 
An important example of Romanesque architecture, it was declared a protected monument in 1931, the current designation being Bien de Interés Cultural.

Necropolis 

There are burial sites of interest in the vicinity of the church. They are from the period of the 
repoblación.

See also 
Hermitage

References

External links 

Bien de Interés Cultural landmarks in La Rioja (Spain)
Christian hermitages in Spain
Romanesque architecture in La Rioja (Spain)